The Molise regional election of 2000 took place on 16 April 2000.

Giovanni Di Stasi (Democrats of the Left) was narrowly elected President, defeating Michele Iorio (Forza Italia). Due to irregularities in the vote, an early election was held a year later, on 11 November 2001.

Results

Source: Ministry of the Interior

2000 elections in Italy
Elections in Molise
April 2000 events in Europe
Annulled elections